Tarazak-e Abdollah (also Romanized as Tarāzak-e ‘Abdollāh; also known as Tarāzī-ye ‘Abd ol ‘Azīz) is a village in Howmeh-ye Jonubi Rural District, in the Central District of Eslamabad-e Gharb County, Kermanshah Province, Iran. At the 2006 census, its population was 76, in 15 families.

References 

Populated places in Eslamabad-e Gharb County